Toronado may refer to:

Tornado (horse), occasionally Toronado, the horse of Zorro
The Fender Toronado guitar
The Oldsmobile Toronado, an automobile produced by Oldsmobile 
The Toronado Rocket, an automobile engine produced by Oldsmobile
Toronado (racehorse), an Irish thoroughbred racehorse

See also
Tornado (disambiguation)